Stephen Bleecker Luce (March 25, 1827 – July 28, 1917) was a U.S. Navy admiral. He was the founder and first president of the Naval War College, between 1884 and 1886.

Biography
Born in Albany, New York, to Dr. Vinal Luce and Charlotte Bleecker, Stephen B. Luce was one of the Navy's outstanding officers in many fields, including strategy, seamanship, education, and professional development. He is best known for being the founder of the Naval War College. In 1854 Luce married Elizabeth Henley, who was a grand niece of Martha Washington, wife of President George Washington. Their children included daughter Caroline (1857–1933), who became the wife of Montgomery M. Macomb, a brigadier general in the United States Army.

Luce entered the Navy, at the age of 14, on October 19, 1841, as a midshipman. He was instructed at the Naval School in Philadelphia until the newly instituted United States Naval Academy in Annapolis, Maryland was opened in 1845. He graduated from the academy in 1848 and was warranted as a passed midshipman to date from August 10, 1847. He was promoted to lieutenant on September 15, 1855.

Civil War 
Luce served with the Atlantic coast blockaders during the American Civil War, and commanded the monitor  at the siege of Charleston, South Carolina. He was promoted to lieutenant commander in 1862. He was assigned to the US Naval Academy in Newport, RI from January 1862 to October 1863. In 1862, while serving as head of the Department of Seamanship at the U.S. Naval Academy, he prepared one of the first seamanship textbooks used by the academy. During the war he also commanded the USS Sonoma, USS Canadaigua and USS Pontiac.

He was promoted to commander in 1866.

Post-Civil War 
After the Civil War, Luce organized the Navy's apprentice training program to prepare seamen and petty officers for fleet duty. He was promoted to captain in December 1872 and served at the Boston Navy Yard until 1875. He commanded the USS Hartford from November 1875 to August 1877. From August to December 1877 Captain Luce was inspector of training ships. From January 1878 to February 1881 he commanded the training ship USS Minnesota.

From July to September 1884 Luce commanded the North Atlantic Squadron with the USS Tennessee as his flagship. From June 1886 to February 1889 Luce commanded the North Atlantic Squadron with the USS Richmond as his flagship. 

Luce was also instrumental in starting the U.S. Naval Institute and its publication, Proceedings. He served as the institute's president from 1887 to 1898.

Newport 
In 1881 Luce was promoted to commodore, in which capacity he commanded the US Navy Training Squadron in Newport from April 1881 to June 1884.

While in command of the Training Squadron, Luce developed and implemented the apprentice training program—the first formal program for training enlisted sailors for service in the Navy. Luce's plan was to have bright and healthy young men (in the age range of 14 to 17 years old) serve a three-year apprenticeship with the Training Squadron during which they received an academic education as well as hands on training to learn various seamanship skills.

The "boys", as the apprentices were officially referred to, were typically enlisted by their parents until they would reach the age of 21 whereupon they could decide if they wished to extend their service in the Navy. Previously, the Navy had taken recruits with no prior experience and all training of enlisted sailors was "on the job". The problem with this approach was that many recruits lacked the discipline and skills necessary to be useful to the Navy. Luce's vision from the apprentice program was to develop sailors who were fully trained and accustomed to navy life prior to joining the fleet. The program ended when the United States entered the First World War in 1917 as the Navy needed to train sailors rapidly for service during the war.

Based on Luce's urgings and exhaustive reports, the Naval War College at Newport, Rhode Island, was established October 6, 1884 with Luce as its first president. In 1885 he was promoted to rear admiral, and in 1886 he was succeeded as president by Captain Alfred Thayer Mahan, whose writings had greatly influenced the Navy's decision to establish the War College.

Retirement 
The USS Richmond was Luce's last assignment at sea before retiring, having reached the mandatory retirement age of 62, on March 25, 1889. Despite being retired, Luce continued his interest in the improving the efficiency of the Navy. He returned to the War College in 1901 and served for nearly a decade as a faculty member. He finally retired in November 1910 at the age of 83.

Affiliations
Luce belonged to several military societies. In 1894 Luce joined the Aztec Club of 1847, a military society of officers who had served during the Mexican War, and served as its president from 1910 to 1911.

He joined the Military Order of Foreign Wars (MOFW) and became the founding commander of the Rhode Island Commandery of the MOFW in 1900. He was also a member of the Military Order of the Loyal Legion of the United States (insignia number 13,113) and the Naval Order of the United States.

In 1901 he was elected to the board of directors of the Redwood Library in Newport.

Luce was an active member of the Protestant Episcopal Church.  He was a vestryman of All Saints Memorial Chapel in Newport, Rhode Island and was also a parishioner of St. John's Episcopal Church in Newport, where he served as a vestryman and as a warden.

Death and burial
Luce died on July 28, 1917 and was buried in the churchyard of St. Mary's Episcopal Church in Portsmouth, Rhode Island.

Publications
In 1863 David Van Nostrand published Stephen Luce's textbook Seamanship (available through Google Books). The work was intended for use at the United States Naval Academy. A later edition appeared in 1905.

In December 1891, The North American Review published Luce's paper "The Benefits of War" (available through JSTOR).

Luce also edited The Patriotic and Naval Songster (1883).

Dates of rank
Reference – U.S. Navy Register, 1899. p. 70.

Midshipman – October 19, 1841
Passed Midshipman – August 10, 1847
Lieutenant – September 16, 1855
Lieutenant Commander – July 16, 1862
Commander – July 25, 1866
Captain – December 28, 1872
Commodore – November 25, 1881
Rear Admiral – October 5, 1885
Retired list – March 25, 1889
Retired on active duty – February 13, 1901
Final retirement – November 1910

Awards

Civil War Campaign Medal
Spanish Campaign Medal

Legacy
Three ships have been named  in his honor.

The United States Naval Academy and the Naval War College both have buildings named Luce Hall in his honor.

The auditorium at the erstwhile Naval Training Center, constructed in 1941 in San Diego, California, was named Luce Auditorium. The library at the State University of New York Maritime College is the Stephen B. Luce Library.

There is a memorial window at St. John's Episcopal Church in Newport in Luce's honor.

There is a plaque in honor of Admiral Luce at the corner of Kay Street and Rhode Island Avenue in Newport.

Notes

References

Further reading
 John A. S. Grenville and George Berkeley Young, Politics, Strategy, and American Diplomacy: Studies in Foreign Policy, 1873–1917 (1966) pp 1–38, on "The Admiral and politics: Stephan B. Luce and the foundation of the modern American Navy".

External links
 

1827 births
1917 deaths
Members of the Aztec Club of 1847
Presidents of the Naval War College
Union Navy officers
United States Navy admirals
Military personnel from Albany, New York
People of New York (state) in the American Civil War
United States Naval Academy alumni
Naval War College faculty
American military writers
United States Navy personnel of the Mexican–American War